North American RailNet, Inc., based in Bedford, Texas, was a holding company of short line railroads. It formerly owned the following:

References 

United States railroad holding companies